Hollyoaks is a British television soap opera first broadcast on Channel 4 on 23 October 1995. The following is a list of characters who currently appear in the programme, listed in order of first appearance. In the case that more than one actor has portrayed a character, the current actor portraying the character is listed first.

Present characters

Regular characters

Recurring and guest characters

Cast changes

Future characters

Returning characters

Former characters

Lists of characters by year of introduction 

 1995–1996
 1997
 1998
 1999
 2000
 2001
 2002
 2003
 2004
 2005
 2006
 2007
 2008
 2009
 2010
 2011
 2012
 2013
 2014
 2015
 2016
 2017
 2018
 2019
 2020
 2021
 2022
 2023

References